Astrolabe Reef is near Motiti Island, 20 kilometres NE of Tauranga, off the Bay of Plenty coast in New Zealand. The reef was named by Jules Dumont d'Urville after his ship Astrolabe, when it nearly ran aground there on 16 February 1827.

Grounding of Rena

On Wednesday, 5 October 2011, the container ship  ran aground on the reef. By Sunday, 9 October, a  oil-slick threatened wildlife and the area's rich fishing waters. By 13 October the ship had started to list and rock in the waves. Over 88 containers, some containing dangerous chemicals, fell into the sea and some washed ashore. The wreck broke in two during stormy weather on 7 January 2012.

An exclusion zone was placed around the wreck during salvage and recovery operations, and this lasted until April 2016, when the reef was re-opened to vessels under . The reef and the unsalvaged remains of the Rena have now become a popular dive site.

See also

Lists of shipwrecks

References

External links
Information and photograph of MV Rena
Footage of deep sea fishing on Astrolabe Reef
3D image of Astrolabe Reef

Landforms of the Bay of Plenty Region
Reefs of New Zealand
Reefs of the Pacific Ocean